The following outline of Apple Inc. is a topical guide to the products, history, retail stores, corporate acquisitions, and personnel under the purview of the American multinational corporation Apple Inc.

Hardware

Mac 

Mac, a family of personal computers made by Apple.
MacBook – notebook lineup
MacBook Air – ultrabook
MacBook Pro – pro notebook
iMac – all-in-one consumer desktop
Mac Mini – small form factor desktop
Mac Studio — small form factor desktop workstation
Mac Pro – customizable desktop workstation

iPhone  

Apple's smartphone.
iPhone SE — Apple's cheapest iPhone
iPhone 13 — last year's iPhone
iPhone 14 (and 14 Plus) — this year's iPhone
IPhone 14 Pro (and Pro Max) — this year's high-end iPhone

iPad 

Apple's tablet lineup.

iPad — the name for Apple's entry-level iPads
iPad Air — a more powerful, higher-end iPad
iPad Mini — smaller iPad
iPad Pro — pro iPad

Apple Watch 

Apple's smartwatch lineup.

 Apple Watch — base model
 Apple Watch Nike — sports smartwatch
 Apple Watch Hermès — fashion smartwatch
 Apple Watch Ultra — high-end model with longer battery

Accessories 

AirPods — wireless audio accessory lineup
AirPods — entry-level earbuds
AirPods Pro — noise-cancelling earbuds
AirPods Max — over-ear headphones
Apple TV —  digital media player
Apple Pencil — digital stylus and input device for iPads
HomePod Mini — home speaker with Siri built-in
Siri Remote — Apple TV remote
Computer displays
Studio Display — consumer display
Pro Display XDR — pro display
Computer peripherals
Magic Keyboard — Apple's keyboard with optional fingerprint sensor for Macintosh computers
Magic Keyboard for iPad — Magic Keyboard version for the iPad Pro and iPad Air
Magic Mouse — Apple's multi-touch mouse 
Magic Trackpad — multi-touch external trackpad

Software

Operating systems 
macOS — for Macs
List of macOS built-in apps – apps built-in to macOS
List of Mac software – a list of applications for macOS
List of Mac games — a list of games for macOS.
Architecture of macOS — macOS's architecture
History of macOS — macOS's history
macOS version history — macOS's version history
iOS — for iPhones
iPadOS — for iPads
watchOS — for Apple Watch
tvOS — for Apple TV
audioOS — for HomePods

macOS

macOS Server

iOS

Software

Pro apps

Services

Consumer-facing 
 Apple Arcade — on-demand game service
 Apple Card — credit card
 Apple Fitness+ — guided workouts
 Apple Music — music streaming service
 Apple News+ — premium news service
 Apple Podcasts — podcast service
 Apple TV+ — video streaming service
 iCloud — consumer cloud service
 iTunes Store — digital media store

Back-end 
 iTunes Connect — service to upload content to the iTunes Store and Apple Books

Developers 

 App Store — app distribution service
 iOS app approvals – app review and approval process
 Mac App Store — app distribution service for macOS
 Apple Developer — Apple's developer network
 WWDC — Apple's yearly developer conference

Apps 
 Instruments — app performance analyzer
 Xcode — integrated development environment (IDE)

APIs 
 CloudKit — allows developers to build iCloud sync into their apps
 Cocoa — Apple's user interface API for macOS
 Cocoa Touch — Apple's user interface API for iOS
 GymKit — protocol for communication between Apple Watch and gym equipment
 HealthKit — APIs to integrate with Apple's Health app
 HomeKit — home automation framework
 Metal — Apple's graphics API on all platforms
 WebKit — open-source browser engine

Retail 

 Apple Store — worldwide chain of over 424 retail stores
 Genius Bar — tech support and repair service at Apple Stores
 Apple Authorized Service Provider — Apple-authorized resellers and repair shops
 AppleCare — warranty and accidental damage support plan for iPhone, iPad and Mac
 Apple certification programs — IT professional certifications for Apple products

History 
History of Apple Inc. — company history
Apple Computer, Inc. v. Microsoft Corporation — a 1994 copyright infringement lawsuit
Timeline of Apple Inc. products — a timeline of all Apple products
develop — Apple's in-house developers' magazine (between Jan 1990 and Mar 1997)

Mac history 
Mac transition to Intel processors — the transition from PowerPC to Intel x86 processors
Mac transition to Apple silicon — the transition from Intel to Apple silicon processors
List of Mac models — list of all Macs throughout history
History of the Macintosh — history of Apple's defunct Macintosh lineup (1984–1998)
Timeline of Apple II family — a timeline of Apple II computers

Defunct displays 
Apple Studio Display — LCD and CRT display lineup (1998–2004)
Apple Cinema Display — defunct display lineup (1999–2011)
Apple ThunderBolt Display — 27-inch computer monitor (2011–2016)

iPhone history 
History of the iPhone — history of Apple's iPhone
List of iOS and iPadOS devices — list of all iOS and iPadOS devices

Defunct iPhones 
 iPhone (1st generation) — released in 2007
 iPhone 3G – released in 2008
 iPhone 3GS – released in 2009
 iPhone 4 – new design, Retina display, released in 2010
 iPhone 4S – adds Siri, released in 2011
 iPhone 5 – 4" screen, new Lightning connector, nano-SIM support, 4G LTE support, released in 2012
 iPhone 5C – lower cost polycarbonate variant
 iPhone 5S – adds Touch ID, released in 2013
 iPhone 6 (and 6 Plus) – larger screen, rounder and thinner design, NFC support with Apple Pay, released in 2014
 iPhone 6S (and 6S Plus) – 12 MP camera, 3D Touch, released in 2015
 iPhone SE (1st generation) – design of the iPhone 5S and internals of the iPhone 6S, released in 2016
 iPhone 7 (and 7 Plus) — remove the 3.5mm headphone jack, released in 2016
 iPhone 8 (and 8 Plus) – support for wireless charging, new Neural Engine, released in 2017
 iPhone X — 5.8" screen, Face ID, released in 2017
 iPhone XS (and XS Max) — improved camera, released in 2018
 iPhone XR – lower-cost model with an LCD screen
 iPhone 11 — released in 2019
 iPhone 11 Pro (and 11 Pro Max) — triple cameras version
 iPhone SE (2nd generation) –  design of the iPhone 8 and internals of the iPhone 11, released in 2020
 iPhone 12 (and 12 Mini) – OLED screen, released in 2021
 iPhone 12 Pro (and 12 Pro Max) – new design, LIDAR sensor, Dolby Vision HDR video recording

Defunct products 
iPod — defunct portable music player lineup
IPod Classic — high-end iPod (2001–2014)
IPod Mini — smaller iPod (2004–2005)
IPod Nano — smallest iPod (2005–2017)
IPod Touch — multitouch iPod (2007–2022)
Newton – defunct personal digital assistant (PDA) lineup, the first ones with handwriting recognition
Xserve — defunct rack-mounted server lineup

Defunct software 
Aperture — professional photo editing app (2005-2015)
Mac OS – the Macintosh operating system preceding macOS (1984–2001)
Mac OS memory management — Mac OS memory management details
System 6 — released in 1988
System 7 — released in 1991
Copland — System 7's scrapped successor (1994–1996)
Mac OS 8 — released in 1997
Mac OS 9 — released in 1999
Xsan – a storage area network for macOS

Defunct protocols 
AFP — defunct disk sharing network protocol
AppleTalk — defunct local networking protocol (1985–2009)

Ancillary operating systems 
A/UX — short-lived commercial OS merging System 7's GUI and application layer atop UNIX on select 68k Macintoshes
MkLinux — a libre experiment in microkernel engineering (1996–2002)

Hardware before 1998

Hardware after 1998

Apple silicon

Technologies and protocols
AirDrop — Mac and iOS filesharing protocol
Apple Lossless – open-source lossless audio codec
Bonjour — Apple's implementation of Zeroconf
CarPlay — a standard for connecting to cars

Personnel

Founders 
Steve Jobs — 1976–1985, 1997–2011 — Co-founder, Chairman, CEO
Steve Wozniak — 1976–1985 — Co-founder, Engineer (ceremonial role; 1985–current)
Ronald Wayne — 1976–1976 — Co-founder (briefly; 2 weeks).

CEOs 
Tim Cook — 2011–current
Former CEOs:
Michael Scott — 1977–1981
Mike Markkula — 1981–1983
John Sculley — 1983–1993
Michael Spindler — 1993–1996
Gil Amelio — 1996–1997
Steve Jobs — 1997–2011

Board of directors 
Al Gore —  1997–current — 45th Vice President of the United States
Tim Cook —  2011–current — President and CEO of Apple
Andrea Jung — 2008–current — former CEO of Avon Products
Arthur D. Levinson — 2000–current — former CEO Genentech, Chairman of Apple Inc. since 2011
Ronald Sugar — 2010–current — former CEO of Northrop Grumman
James A. Bell — 2015–current — former CFO of Boeing
Alex Gorsky — 2021–current — CEO of Johnson & Johnson
Monica C. Lozano — 2021–current — CEO of College Futures Foundation
Susan Wagner — 2014–current — BlackRock founding partner and director

Former board members 
Bill Campbell — 1997–2016 — former chairman and CEO of Intuit
Millard Drexler — 1999–2015 — former chairman and CEO, J. Crew
Jerry York — 1997–2010 — former CFO of IBM and Chrysler
Bob Iger — 2011–2019 — former President and CEO, The Walt Disney Company

Executives 
Tim Cook — 1998–current — CEO (previously SVP of Worldwide Sales and Operations)
Jeff Williams — 1998–current — COO
Luca Maestri — 2013–current — CFO
Katherine L. Adams — 2017–current — General Counsel
Greg "Joz" Joswiak — 1986–current — SVP Worldwide Marketing
Craig Federighi — 1996–1999 — SVP Software Engineering.
Eddy Cue — 1989–current — SVP Services.
John Giannandrea — 2018–current — SVP Machine Learning and AI Strategy
John Ternus — 2001–current — SVP Hardware Engineering
Johny Srouji — 2008–current — SVP Hardware Technologies
Deirdre O'Brien — 1991–current — SVP Retail + People
Sabih Khan — 1995–current — SVP Operations

Former executives 
Peter Oppenheimer — 1996–2014 — SVP and CFO
Henri Lamiraux — 1990–2013 — former iOS (previously Mac OS then OS X) Software Engineering VP
Scott Forstall — 1996–2011 — former SVP of iOS Software.
Ron Johnson — 2000–2011 — former SVP of Retail Operations.
John Browett — 2012–2012 — SVP of Retail. Former CEO of Dixons.
Mark Papermaster — 2008–2010 — former SVP of Devices Hardware Engineering.
Bertrand Serlet — 1997–2011 — former SVP of Software Engineering
Sina Tamaddon — 1997–? — former SVP of Applications
Angela Ahrendts — 2014–2019 — former SVP of Retail. Formerly CEO of Burberry
Jonathan Ive — 1992–2019 — CDO (previously SVP of Industrial Design)
Bruce Sewell — 2009–? — formerly General Counsel
Dan Riccio — 1998–current — former SVP of Hardware Engineering, currently working on unnamed project
Phil Schiller — 1987–current — Apple Fellow (previously SVP of Worldwide Marketing)
Bob Mansfield — 2005–2012 — former SVP of Mac and Devices Hardware Engineering (later Technologies), from July 2013, retained for "special projects"

Other contributors 
Mark Davis, software engineer and language programmer who started his career at Apple

Apple worker organizations

Subsidiaries

Braeburn Capital – Apple-owned asset management company
FileMaker Inc. – Apple subsidiary that designs and releases database applications
Kaleida Labs – (founded 1992) a partnership co-founded with IBM as a result of the historic 1991 AIM alliance, meant to explore the creation of multimedia platforms
Taligent – (founded March 2, 1992), a partnership co-founded with IBM as a result of the historic 1991 AIM alliance, meant to bring the radically object-oriented operating system Pink to market

Mergers and acquisitions 
Apple Inc. mergers and acquisitions – a list of company mergers and acquisitions by Apple (in alphabetical order):
AlgoTrim – (bought August 2013), a Swedish data compression company, especially focused on still/video image compression, founded by Anders Berglund, Anders Holtsberg, and Martin Lindberg in 2005.
Anobit – (bought December 2011), an Israeli fabless flash memory company, founded by Ehud Weinstein, Ariel Maislos, and Ofir Shalvi in 2006.
AuthenTec – (bought July 2012), security hardware and software for PCs and mobile device company, founded in 1998.
Beats Electronics – (bought August 2014), music headphones and streaming service
Chomp – (bought February 2012), an app search engine company, founded by Ben Keighran and Cathy Edwards in 2009.
Cue – (bought October 2013), a personal assistant app company, founded by Daniel Gross and Robby Walker in 2010.
Emagic – (bought July 2002), music software and hardware company, best known for its music sequencer, Logic.
Embark – (bought August 2013), a startup company focused on developing transit information apps for user public transportation navigation in major US cities, founded by John Hering, David Hodge, Taylor Malloy, and Ian Leighton in 2011.
FingerWorks – (bought early 2005), a gesture recognition company, founded by John Elias and Wayne Westerman in 1998.
HopStop – (bought July 2013), an online transit guide with subway, bus directions, and maps, founded by Chinedu Echeruo in 2005.
Intrinsity – (bought April 2010), fabless semiconductor company, founded as EVSX in 1997 on the remnants of Exponential Technology, then renamed Intrinsity in 2000.
Lala – (bought December 2009), online music store company, founded by Bill Nguyen.
Locationary – (bought July 2013), a Canadian crowdsourced location data management company, founded by Grant Ritchie in 2009.
Matcha – (bought August 2013), a second screen TV/video startup, previously available as a media discovery iOS app (closed in May 2013), founded by Guy Piekarz, Ilan Ben Zeev, and Paul Petrick in September 2010.
NeXT – (bought December 1996), computer company, founded in 1985 by Apple Inc. co-founder Steve Jobs after he was fired from Apple the same year. Current macOS, iOS, watchOS, and tvOS operating systems are largely built on its programming environment standard, OpenStep. Early versions of Mac OS X Server (codename Rhapsody) were OPENSTEP with a Mac-look and feel.
Nothing Real – (bought February 2002), a high-end digital effects software development company for the feature film, broadcast and interactive gaming industries, founded by Allen Edwards and Arnaud Hervas in October 1996.
P.A. Semi – (bought April 2008), a fabless semiconductor company founded by Daniel W. Dobberpuhl in 2003.
Particle – (bought September 2012), a HTML5 web app company, founded by Ericson de Jesus, Cole Rise, and Aubrey Anderson in 2008.
Passif Semiconductor – (bought August 2013), an Oakland, California based semiconductor company specializing in low energy wireless chips, founded by Ben Cook and Axel Berny in 2007.
PrimeSense – (bought November 2013), an Israeli fabless semiconductor company specializing in 3D sensing, founded by Aviad Maizels, Alexander Shpunt, Ophir Sharon, Tamir Berliner and Dima Rais in 2005.
Redmatica – (bought June 2012), an Italian music editing software company, known for Keymap Pro sampler software, founded by Andrea Gozzi in 2004.
Silicon Color – (bought October 2006), "FinalTouch" color correction software and non-linear video editing software development company, now known as Apple's Final Cut Pro software.
Siri – (bought April 2010), an intelligent personal assistant and knowledge navigator software company, founded by Dag Kittlaus, Adam Cheyer, Tom Gruber, together with Norman Winarsky in 2007. Apple initially integrated the software into iOS, the later to the watchOS and tvOS platforms.
Spruce Technologies – (bought July 2001), a DVD authoring company, founded by Dr. Hiromu Soga in 1996.
Topsy – (bought December 2013), a US data analytics company, founded by Vipul Ved Prakash, Rishab Aiyer Ghosh, Gary Iwatani, Justin Foutts in 2007.
WiFiSlam – (bought March 2013), an indoor location services company, founded by former Stanford students Darin Tay, Joseph Huang, Jessica Tsoong and Dave Millman in 2011.

Design
Design motifs – design elements intrinsic to Apple Inc. products.
Apple Industrial Design Group (IDg) – the industrial design arm that crafts product design
Typography of Apple Inc. – typography and typefacesused by Apple Inc. in its marketing and operating systems

Media
Media events – special events where Apple Inc. announce the release of their products and services. Usually, this is done by Apple's current CEO often featuring other executives, previously most notably Steve Jobs.
Stevenote – keynote addresses, usually held at the beginning of media events, where former CEO Steve Jobs would announce the release of new Apple products. Noted for his idiosyncratic style of presenting, and also for his "One More Thing..." surprise announcements at the end.
Advertising – various Apple Inc. advertising techniques and campaigns.
1984 (advertisement) – specific TV and print ad campaign, inferring how Mac computers will free users from tyrannies similar to those prophesied in the George Orwell novel Nineteen Eighty-Four. Launched the first Macintosh computer; the Macintosh 128K.
Think different – specific TV & print ad campaign, inferring how Macs do things differently (meaning better) to other computers used in the home and small to medium-sized businesses.
Get a Mac – TV ad campaign, humorously inferring the superior nature of a Mac vs. Windows PC.
iPod advertising – various iPod ad campaigns since its initial release in 2001.

Apple-related
Apple community – the many various online websites and offline groups where Apple Inc.'s products and services are discussed and analyzed, as well as future products rumored about.
Apple Campus – the Cupertino, California-based set of buildings forming the basis of Apple Inc.'s main campus business headquarters, where most office staff are based. A new, mostly single building, called Apple Campus 2 is being designed.
Apple Inc. litigation – various legal disputes the company has been involved in.
Criticism of Apple Inc. – various criticisms leveled at Apple Inc.
Mac transition to Intel processors – the process of Apple changing the CPU of Macintosh computers from PowerPC processors to Intel x86 processors, during 2006.
Apple–Intel architecture – the architecture of Intel-based Apple computers, using Intel x86 processors rather than the PowerPC and 68k processors used in their predecessors.
Universal binary – in Apple parlance, an executable file or application bundle that runs natively on either PowerPC or Intel-manufactured IA-32 or Intel 64-based Macs; it is an implementation of the concept more generally known as a fat binary.
Xslimmer – macOS utility application developed by LateNiteSoft, designed to tweak universal binaries applications by stripping the binary from either its PowerPC or Intel code (depending on the system architecture used), in order to save hard disk space.
Rosetta – a dynamic binary translator application for Mac OS X allowing many PowerPC apps to run on certain Intel-based Macs without modification. Released in 2006 for the transition from PowerPC to Intel processors on the Macintosh platform, but it was dropped in Lion so Snow Leopard is the last version of Mac OS X that is able to run PowerPC-only applications.
Mac 68K emulator – lower level program, similar in purpose to Rosetta, but instead used during the transition from 680x0 to PowerPC processors.
Macintosh clone – a personal computer made by a manufacturer other than Apple, using (or compatible with) Macintosh firmware and system software.
Star Trek – code name of prototype project between Apple and Novell from February/March 1992 to 1993, which was to be a version of the classic Mac OS running as a GUI on Intel-compatible x86 PCs on top of Novell's next in-development version of OS, DR DOS.
OSx86/Hackintosh – (from OS X and x86) is a collaborative hacking project to run OS X on non-Apple PCs with x86 architecture and x86-64 compatible processors.

Miscellaneous 
 After finishing college, Apple's SVP of Industrial Design and Human Interface, Jony Ive, co-founded a London design agency, Tangerine. After leaving Apple, he and colleague Marc Newson started new agency, LoveFrom.

See also
Outline of iOS
Microsoft
Pixar

References

External links

 – official site

AppleInc.
AppleInc.
+